Marvel Legends Showdown (initially named Marvel Superhero Showdown) is a collectible tabletop game in which the primary component is action figures and cards. It was a collaboration between Upper Deck Entertainment and Toy Biz (Now known as Marvel Toys).

The game was played on at least a 3×4 grid of Panel cards. Panel cards broke into two categories; Locations (Places in the Marvel Universe) and Plot Twist (Special events that occurred on that space)  The goal was to move around the Panel card grid and knock out your opponents character with Punches, Kicks, or shooting them with an included projectile launchers. Once you did three damage to a character he/she was out. The more characters on each side, the larger the Panel grid had to be. (2 on 2 a 4×4 grid, 3 on 3 a 5×5 grid, 4 on 4 and 6×6 grid and so on)

It was released in 2005 with two starters and two waves of five boosters each. The set was renamed Legends Showdown to tie it in to the popular Marvel Legends figures. The first two starters and booster sets were re-released with the new name, plus 2 new starters, 3 rider packs, and two new waves of boosters (Though these two waves 3 and 4 had limited release, seen in comic shops and KayBee Toys shelves rarely). Toy Biz changed its name to Marvel Toys and then sold the rights to all Marvel action figure properties to Hasbro. Marvel Legends Showdown was not one of the product lines that transferred over.

The Starters included 2 figures, 2 projectile launchers, 3 power cards for each figure, 12 Panel cards, and 2 dice.

Boosters included a figure, a projectile launcher, 3 power cards for that character, 3 power cards for other characters in the wave, and 1 panel card.

All characters had at least 6 Power Cards, but some may have had up to 10 or 12! (Spider-Man had 3 different figures, starter Spider-Man had cards 1-3, Black Costume Spider-Man from the Booster had cards 4-6, and sometimes had cards found only in the boosters.)

Checklist

Figures

Starter Wave 1
 Spider-Man vs. Thing
 Hulk vs. Wolverine

Booster Wave 1
 Berserker Wolverine (chase) 
 Black Costume Spider-Man 
 Doctor Octopus
 Ghost Rider 
 The Punisher

Booster Wave 2
 Captain America 
 Dr. Doom
 Human Torch 
 Iron Man
 Spider-sense Spider-Man (chase)

Rider Wave 1
 Ghost Rider on Motorcycle
 Namor on Hammerhead Shark 
 Wolverine on Chopper

Starter Wave 2
 Magneto vs. Colossus
 Mole Man vs. Mr. Fantastic

Booster Wave 3
 Beast
 Elektra
 Green Goblin
 Juggernaut
 Silver Surfer

Booster Wave 4
 Cyclops
 Daredevil
 Invisible Woman
 Thor
 Venom

Repaints and Variants
 Beast's 
 Daredevil's 
 Elektra's 
 Invisible Woman's 
 Juggernaut's 
 Mr. Fantastic's

Panel Cards

Wave 1
Starter Wave 1 and Booster Waves 1 and 2:

 P-01 360 Degree Vision
 P-02 Acrobatic Dodge 
 P-03 Armory
 P-04 Asgard 
 P-05 Base of Operation 
 P-06 Baxter Building
 P-07 Blind Alley 
 P-08 Blindsided 
 P-09 Burning Mad 
 P-10 Cerebro 
 P-11 Daily Bugle 
 P-12 Danger Room 
 P-13 Dark Alley 
 P-14 Doc Ock's Lab
 P-15 Earthquake! 
 P-16 Find Weakness 
 P-17 Flurry of Blows 
 P-18 Graveyard
 P-19 Gust of Wind
 P-20 Handy Weapon 
 P-21 Huge Target 
 P-22 Leg Sweep 
 P-23 Medical Attention 
 P-24 Mindless Attack 
 P-25 Muir Island 
 P-26 Mystical Transformation 
 P-27 Not So Fast 
 P-28 Outnumbered 
 P-29 Rejuvenation 
 P-30 Revenge Strike 
 P-31 Road Block 
 P-32 Stop Time 
 P-33 Super Punch 
 P-34 Teleportation 
 P-35 Victory Stance
 P-36 War Room

Wave 2
Starter wave 2, Rider sets, Booster Waves 3 and 4:

 P-37 Absent Friends 
 P-38 All in Due Time 
 P-39 Armed to the Teeth 
 P-40 Avalon Space Station 
 P-41 Body Blow 
 P-42 Boulder Toss 
 P-43 Caught Off-Guard 
 P-44 Come to Me! 
 P-45 Desperate Measures
 P-46 Double Trouble 
 P-47 Field Dressing 
 P-48 Genosha 
 P-49 Hostage Situation 
 P-50 Meditation 
 P-51 Mega Punch 
 P-52 Nerve Center 
 P-53 New Fantastic Four Building 
 P-54 Parry 
 P-55 Phoenix Rising 
 P-56 Pride  
 P-57 Reed's Underwater Lab 
 P-58 S.H.I.E.L.D. Base 
 P-59 Sabotage 
 P-60 Sanctuary 
 P-61 Smash! 
 P-62 Strength in Numbers 
 P-63 Surge of Power 
 P-64 Surprise Attack 
 P-65 Knee Strike 
 P-66 The Dojo 
 P-67 The Maelstrom
 P-68 Uncontrollable Rage
 P-69 Underground Base
 P-70 Underwater Arena
 P-71 Brute Force Attack
 P-72 Weapons Locker

Power Cards

Beast
 BST-01 Acrobat 
 BST-02 Feral Rage 
 BST-03 Super-Leap 
 BST-04 Genius 
 BST-05 New Perspective 
 BST-06 True Blue Friend

Captain America
 CAP-01 Retrieve
 CAP-02 Ricochet
 CAP-03 Shield Bash
 CAP-04 Leadership
 CAP-05 Shield Defense
 CAP-06 Tactics

Colossus
 COL-01 Organic Steel
 COL-02 Stand Firm 
 COL-03 Strength of Character 
 COL-04 Fastball Special 
 COL-05 Self-Sacrifice 
 COL-06 Transformation

Cyclops
 CYC-01 Defensive Blast 
 CYC-02 Optic Blast
 CYC-03 Surprise Attack
 CYC-04 Leadership 
 CYC-05 Overload
 CYC-06 Revenge

Daredevil
 DAD-01 Baton Strike 
 DAD-02 Heightened Senses 
 DAD-03 Sonar 
 DAD-04 Amazing Agility 
 DAD-05 Man Without Fear 
 DAD-06 Swing Line 
 DAD-07 Blind Luck

Doc Ock
 DOK-01 Dangerous Experiment
 DOK-02 Tentacles of Fury
 DOK-03 What are the Odds?
 DOK-04 Easy Eight
 DOK-05 Four-way Attack
 DOK-06 Idle Hands

Dr. Doom
 DRD-01 Plan B
 DRD-02 The Power Cosmic
 DRD-03 Reign of Terror
 DRD-04 Decoy Program 
 DRD-05 Mystical Confusion
 DRD-06 Mystical Fog

Elektra
 ELK-01 Crossed Blades
 ELK-02 Double Sai Strike 
 ELK-03 Waiting in Ambush
 ELK-04 Concentration
 ELK-05 Mystical Training
 ELK-06 Group Tactics 
 ELK-07 Contract
 ELK-08 Counterstrike

Ghost Rider
 GHR-01 Chain Attack
 GHR-02 Relentless Assault
 GHR-03 Revenge
 GHR-04 Burn Rubber
 GHR-05 Penance Stare
 GHR-06 Vengeance
 GHR-07 Burning Mad 
 GHR-08 Road Warrior 
 GHR-09 Spirit of Vengeance
 GHR-10 (Unconfirmed)

Green Goblin
 GRG-01 Strike From Above
 GRG-02 Flight
 GRG-03 Pumpkin Bomb
 GRG-04 Hostile Takeover 
 GRG-05 Inner Struggle 
 GRG-06 Paranoia

Hulk
 HLK-01 Crushing Blow
 HLK-02 Getting Angry
 HLK-03 Super-Leap
 HLK-04 Hulking Out
 HLK-05 Hulk Smash!
 HLK-06 Rush of Adrenaline

Invisible Woman
 IVW-01 Force Bubble
 IVW-02 Flight 
 IVW-03 Enraged 
 IVW-04 Stealth Strike 
 IVW-05 Force Field 
 IVW-06 Invisibility 
 IVW-07 Shockwave 
 IVW-08 Psionic Blast

Iron Man
 IRM-01 Focused Blast 
 IRM-02 Jet Boots
 IRM-03 Power Strike 
 IRM-04 Recharge 
 IRM-05 Energy Shield 
 IRM-06 Wide Beam

Juggernaut
 JUG-01 Flying Tackle
 JUG-02 Mystical Energy
 JUG-03 Smash!
 JUG-04 Appetite for Destruction 
 JUG-05 Steamroller 
 JUG-06 Unmasked 
 JUG-07 Invasion
 JUG-08 Reckless Charge

Magneto
 MAG-01 Flight 
 MAG-02 Magnetic Personality 
 MAG-03 Magnetic Force 
 MAG-04 Entangle 
 MAG-05 Leadership
 MAG-06 Twisted Metal

Mole Man
 MOM-01 Bojutsu Strike
 MOM-02 Burrowing
 MOM-03 High Ground
 MOM-04 Sewer Surprise
 MOM-05 Sinkhole
 MOM-06 Summon Monster

Mr. Fantastic
 MRF-01 Brilliant Mind
 MRF-02 Framistat
 MRF-03 Stretch Attack
 MRF-04 Far-Reaching Plans
 MRF-05 Long-Range Grab
 MRF-06 Twisted Dodge

Namor
 NAM-01 Flight
 NAM-02 Force of Will 
 NAM-03 Shark 
 NAM-04 (Unconfirmed) 
 NAM-05 (Unconfirmed) 
 NAM-06 (Unconfirmed)

Punisher
 PUN-01 Extra Ammo 
 PUN-02 Outgunned 
 PUN-03 Punishment 
 PUN-04 Cover Fire 
 PUN-05 Dual Sidearms 
 PUN-06 Fully Loaded

Silver Surfer
 SIS-01 High-Speed Turn
 SIS-02 The Power Cosmic 
 SIS-03 Surf's Up 
 SIS-04 Cosmic Awareness 
 SIS-05 Molecular Control 
 SIS-06 Tireless Warrior

Spider-Man
 SPM-01 Spider Strength
 SPM-02 Web Shooter 
 SPM-03 Web Slinging 
 SPM-04 Alien Symbiote 
 SPM-05 Come To Me! 
 SPM-06 Spider Reflexes 
 SPM-07 Sticky Situation
 SPM-08 Altered Genetics 
 SPM-09 Spider Senses 
 SPM-10 Wall Crawling

Thing
 THG-01 Batter Up!
 THG-02 It's Clobberin' Time! 
 THG-03 One-Two Punch 
 THG-04 Charge! 
 THG-05 Rock Solid 
 THG-06 Stomp!

Thor
 THR-01 Divine Protector
 THR-02 Hammer Time 
 THR-03 Mjolnir 
 THR-04 Flight 
 THR-05 God of Thunder
 THR-06 Retrieve

Venom
 VNM-01 Keen Senses
 VNM-02 Rage 
 VNM-03 Web Slinging 
 VNM-04 Fear
 VNM-05 The Symbiote
 VNM-06 Tongue Lashing

Wolverine

 WLV-01 Combat Reflexes
 WLV-02 Healing Factor
 WLV-03 Snikt! 
 WLV-04 Berserker Rage 
 WLV-05 Deep Wound 
 WLV-06 Nasty Surprise 
 WLV-07 Heightened Senses
 WLV-08 Intense Training
 WLV-09 Chopper
 WLV-10 In One Swing
 WLV-11 Shrug It Off
 WLV-12 (Unconfirmed)

Notes

External links 
Official Homepage: Toybiz's Archive
Marvel Legends Showdown Action Figure Checklist

Games based on comics
Collectible action figure games
Upper Deck Company games
Marvel Comics games